The Freedom of the City, in military terms, is an honour conferred by a city council upon a military unit, which grants that unit the privilege of marching into the city "with drums beating, colours flying, and bayonets fixed". The honour is usually bestowed upon local regiments, in recognition of their dedicated service, and it is common for military units to periodically exercise their freedom by arranging a parade through the city.

Australia

Adelaide, South Australia
 
 No. 24 Squadron RAAF

Alice Springs, Northern Territory
 NORFORCE: 1984
 
 Detachment 421, United States Air Force
 No. 1 Radar Surveillance Unit, Royal Australian Air Force

Ararat, Victoria
 HMAS Ararat II: 16 June 2018.

Bairnsdale, Victoria
 The 4th/19th Prince of Wales's Light Horse: 15 March 1986.

Bendigo, Victoria
 17th Construction Squadron Workshop: 20 October 2015.

Brisbane, Queensland
 Brisbane Port Division, RANR: 8 October 1983.

Broome, Western Australia
 NORFORCE: 1987

Cairns, Queensland
 , RAN: 26 June 2022.

Canberra, Australian Capital Territory
 
 Australian Defence Force Academy: 15 September 1995.
 2001: Royal Military College Duntroon, during that year's GMC 400.

Charters Towers, Queensland
 1st Battalion, Royal Australian Regiment: 23 June 1977

Darwin, Northern Territory
 NORFORCE: 1982 and 2016
 : October 1985.
 , RAN: 2013.

Derby, Western Australia
 NORFORCE: 1983

Devonport, Tasmania
 , RAN: 2014.

Gawler, South Australia
 , RAN: 26 April 1986.

Gold Coast, Queensland
 41st Field Battery, Royal Australian Artillery: 1967.
 1st Military District Band: 1989.
 213 Squadron Australian Air Force Cadets: 30 October 2016.
 221 Squadron Australian Air Force Cadets: 30 October 2016.
 222 Squadron Australian Air Force Cadets: 30 October 2016.
 232 Squadron Australian Air Force Cadets: 30 October 2016.

Gosford, New South Wales
 TS Hawkesbury, Australian Navy Cadets.

Goulburn, New South Wales
 325 (City of Goulburn) Squadron Australian Air Force Cadets: 7 October 2020.

Ipswich, Queensland
 RAAF Base Amberley: 17 June 1970.

Kalgoolie, Western Australia
 16th Battalion The Royal Western Australia Regiment.

Katherine, Northern Territory
 NORFORCE: 1986
 RAAF Base Tindal: 29 September 2018.

Kingaroy, Queensland
 The Defence Force School of Signals Electronic Warfare Wing: 8 July 2017.

Kogarah, New South Wales
 9th Regiment, Royal Australian Artillery: 14 April 2018.

Ku-ring-gai, New South Wales
 17th Battalion The Royal New South Wales Regiment: 17 September 1978.

Kununurra, Western Australia
 NORFORCE: 1990

Lake Macquarie
 , RAN: 9 August 1991.

Launceston, Tasmania
 No.5 Wing 508 Squadron Australian Air Force Cadets: 21 March 2021.
 TS Tamar Australian Navy Cadets: 21 March 2021.
 52 ACU Launceston Australian Army Cadets: 21 March 2021.
 67 ACU Youngtown Australian Army Cadets: 21 March 2021.

Liverpool
 School of Military Engineering: 1959.

Maitland, New South Wales
 , RAN: 30 September 2006.
 308 (City of Maitland) Squadron Australian Air Force Cadets: 16 November 2013.

Melbourne
 The Melbourne University Regiment: 29 September 2009.
 : 16 September 2011.
 
 The Defence Force School of Signals.

Mosman, New South Wales

Newcastle, New South Wales
 : 13 December 1994.

Normanton, Queensland
 1st Battalion, Royal Australian Regiment: 12 October 1974

Northam, Western Australia
 10th Light Horse Regiment: 1979

North Sydney, New South Wales
 , RAN: 27 November 1992.

Nowra, New South Wales
 , RAN: 1979.
 HMAS Creswell, RAN: 1979.

Onkaparinga, South Australia
 40th Regional Cadet Unit Noarlunga: 1998.
 Squadron 605 Australian Air Force Cadets: 2004.  
 Australian Navy Cadets TS Noarlunga: 2004.
 619 Squadron, Australian Air Force Cadets: 2016.

Parramatta
 The 1st/15th Royal New South Wales Lancers: 18 October 1959.
 , RAN: 28 July 2003.

Perth

 , RAN: 4 March 1966. 
 16th Battalion, The Royal Western Australia Regiment: 2 October 1960.
 11th/28th Battalion, The Royal Western Australia Regiment.
 No. 25 (City of Perth) Squadron RAAF: 2 March 1976
 The 10th Light Horse Regiment: 25 March 2023.

Port Stephens
 130 Signals Squadron

Queanbeyan, New South Wales
 , RAN: 17 October 1981.

Sale
 RAAF Base East Sale: 1959.

Salisbury, South Australia
 RAAF Base Edinburgh: 26 March 1988.

Shoalhaven, New South Wales
 Fleet Air Arm, RAN:21 October 2022.
 , RAN:21 October 2022.
 HMAS Creswell, RAN:21 October 2022.

Sydney
 Royal Australian Navy: 14 March 2009
 
 3 Wing, Australian Air Force Cadets

Tamworth, New South Wales
 12th/16th Hunter River Lancers.

Tennant Creek
 NORFORCE: 1994

Townsville
 2nd Battalion, Royal Australian Regiment: 15 October 1971.
 1st Battalion, Royal Australian Regiment: 25 August 1996
 3rd Brigade Lavarack Barracks: 27 August 2014.

Wollongong
 , RAN: 27 August 2017.
 4th/3rd Battalion, Royal New South Wales Regiment.
On 27 September 1980 the officers and crew of the Australian submarine HMAS Orion were granted the Freedom of the City of Wollongong in perpetuity.

Wyndham, Western Australia
 NORFORCE: 1986

Belgium

Herentals
 Ordnance Depot Antwerp: 1987.

Ypres
 Princess Patricia's Canadian Light Infantry: 1964.

Canada

Alberta

Airdrie
 Calgary Highlanders

Banff
 3 Squadron 41 Signal Regiment: 22 October 2016.
 Rocky Mountain National Army Cadet Summer Training Centre (formerly BNACC)

Bon Accord
 1 Combat Engineer Regiment: 3 June 2017.

Bonnyville
 The Royal Canadian Legion (Bonnyville Branch 183): 1 July 2016.
 4 Wing Cold Lake: 5 May 2017.

Canmore
 878 Banff/Canmore Royal Canadian Air Cadet Squadron

Calgary
 Calgary Highlanders: 1956.
 1st Battalion The Queen's Own Rifles of Canada: 11 June 1960.
 King's Own Calgary Regiment
 Lord Strathcona's Horse (Royal Canadians)
 
 4 Wing Cold Lake: 11 May 1999.
 
 41 Signal Regiment
 14 (Calgary) Service Battalion: 24 April 1982.
41 Service Battalion: 19 October 2019.
 52 City of Calgary Air Cadets
 538 Buffalo Squadron
 22 RCSCC Undaunted

Cold Lake
 4 Wing Cold Lake: 27 August 2004.

Drumheller
 Correctional Service of Canada: 9 September 2017.

Edmonton
 Princess Patricia's Canadian Light Infantry: 1966. (exercised in 2004 and on  10 August 2014 on occasion of the 100th Anniversary of the Regiment).
 The Canadian Airborne Regiment: 1976.
 The Loyal Edmonton Regiment (4th Battalion, Princess Patricia's Canadian Light Infantry)
 15 (Edmonton) Service Battalion: 3 June 1995. 
 408 Tactical Helicopter Squadron, RCAF: 2001.
 
 1 Service Battalion: 26 August 2018.

Fort McMurray
 Royal Canadian Mounted Police (Wood Buffalo Detachment): 21 September 2013.

Gibbons
 Princess Patricia's Canadian Light Infantry: 15 September 2014. 
 Canadian Military Engineers.
 Lord Strathcona's Horse: 22 October 2010.

Grande Cache
 The Correctional Service of Canada: 17 October 2015.

High River
 187 Foothills Squadron Royal Canadian Air Cadets: 22 September 2016.

Lethbridge
 429 Transport Squadron, RCAF: 2008.

Medicine Hat
 South Alberta Light Horse: October 2005.
 CFB Suffield: 23 April 2015.
 British Army Training Unit Suffield: 23 April 2015.

Morinville
 1 Service Battalion: September 2011.

Okotoks
 187 Squadron Royal Canadian Air Cadets: 24 May 2017.

Red Deer
 41 Signal Regiment

Rocky Mountain House
 198 Yukon Corps Royal Canadian Sea Cadets: 23 September 2018.

St. Albert
 Lord Strathcona's Horse (Royal Canadians): 11 June 2011.

Strathcona County
 Lord Strathcona's Horse (Royal Canadians): 24 August 2013.

Vegreville
 41 Combat Engineer Regiment: 29 April 2006.

Wetaskiwin
 1 Military Police Regiment: 27 June 2009.

British Columbia

Armstrong
 The Royal Canadian Legion (Armstrong Branch 35).

Chilliwack
 39 Combat Engineer Regiment: 26 October 2013. 
 Royal Westminster Regiment: 26 October 2013.
 39 Service Battalion: 26 October 2013.

Comox
 .
 19 Wing Comox.

Courtenay
 CFB Comox: March 1996.
 The Canadian Scottish Regiment (Princess Mary's): October 1996.
 HMCS Quadra: August 2008.

 The Royal Canadian Legion (Courtenay Branch): 1 July 2016.

Esquimalt
 3rd Battalion Princess Patricia's Canadian Light Infantry: 16 September 1972.

Fort St. John
 2276 Royal Canadian Army Cadet Corps: 10 April 2006.

Kamloops
 Rocky Mountain Rangers: 19 February 1980.
 CFS Kamloops: 15 May 1984.
 The Royal Canadian Legion (Branch No.52): 18 November 1986.
 The Army, Navy and Air Force Veterans in Canada (Unit 290): 27 February 1990.
 419 Tactical Fighter Training Squadron, RCAF: 1 July 1993.

 886 (Kamloops Overlander) Wing: 2009.

Kelowna
 British Columbia Dragoons: 11 February 1963

Maple Ridge
 Royal Canadian Legion (Maple Ridge Branch 88).
 The Royal Westminster Regiment.

Nanaimo
 South Alberta Regiment: April 1941.
 Le Régiment de Hull: May 1943.  Le Régiment de Hull was the first French speaking unit to be posted to the West Coast.  It so worried the residents that they doubled their police force.  The residents and the Regiment soon broke the linguistic barrier and formed a bond of friendship, often playing in softball tournaments and learning French-Canadien folk songs.
 Canadian Scottish Regiment (Princess Mary's): 5 October 1974.
 , RCN: March 1997.

New Westminster
 Royal Westminster Regiment, then called the Westminster Regiment: 24 May 1963.
 , RCN: 3 October 2010.

Pitt Meadows
 The Royal Westminster Regiment: 22 September 2012.

Port Moody
 Royal Canadian Legion (Port Moody Branch 119): 16 October 2005.

Prince George
 The Rocky Mountain Rangers: 21 April 2018.
 The Royal Canadian Army Cadets

Qualicum Beach
 19 Mission Support Squadron, RCAF: 7 May 2022.

Richmond
 12 (Vancouver) Service Company, then called 12 Service Battalion: 17 April 1993.
 39 Service Battalion: 13 April 2014.

Saanich

 11 (Victoria) Service Company, then called 11 Service Battalion: April 1994.
 11 (Victoria) Field Ambulance, then called 11 (Victoria) Medical Company: September 1994.
 39 Service Battalion: 2 May 2014.

Sechelt
 2963 Seaforth Highlanders of Canada, RCACC: 29 August 1998.

Vancouver
 , RCN: 13 February 1973.
 15th Field Artillery Regiment, RCA:  12 June 1977.
 Seaforth Highlanders of Canada: 6 December 1977.
 British Columbia Regiment: 26 April 1983.
 12 (Vancouver) Field Ambulance: 14 April 2007.
 The Seaforth Highlanders of Canada: 16 April 2011. 
 Vancouver Police Pipe band: 23 January 2014.

Vernon
 Vernon Army Cadet Summer Training Centre: 4 August 1979
 British Columbia Dragoons: 10 May 2008

Victoria
 3rd Battalion Princess Patricia's Canadian Light Infantry: 15 June 1974
 
 Maritime Forces Pacific: 5 May 1985.
 5th (British Columbia) Field Artillery Regiment, RCA: 4 November 1979. 
 2nd Battalion The Queen's Own Rifles of Canada: 
 The Canadian Scottish Regiment (Princess Mary's): 6 June 1964
 Royal Roads Military College

Manitoba

Brandon
 2nd Battalion Princess Patricia's Canadian Light Infantry: 22 May 2012.
 CFB Shilo: 22 June 2017.

Winnipeg
 2nd Battalion Princess Patricia's Canadian Light Infantry: 1989.
 : 5 May 1985.
 Royal Winnipeg Rifles: 4 June 1983.
 CFB Winnipeg: October 1992.

New Brunswick

Dorchester
 Correctional Service of Canada: 27 July 2015.

Fredericton
Royal Canadian Regiment: 2 June 1973
 1st Battalion, The Royal New Brunswick Regiment (Carleton and York): 1991
 Argonuat CSTC: 8 August 2004.

Moncton
 The Royal Canadian Regiment.

Oromocto
 Argonuat CSTC: 1989.

Sackville
 Argonuat CSTC: 2000.

Saint John
 3rd Field Artillery Regiment (The Loyal Company) The Royal Regiment of Canadian Artillery: 13 December 1968.
 The Black Watch (Royal Highland Regiment) of Canada: 18 May 1970.
 2nd Battalion The Royal Canadian Regiment: 9 July 1983.
 , RCN: 6 July 1985.
 1st Battalion The Royal New Brunswick Regiment: 18 September 1993.
 722 (Saint John) Communication Squadron The Communications and Electronics Branch: 11 June 1994.
 31 (Saint John) Service Battalion: 24 September 1994.
 410 City of Saint John Squadron, RCAF: 3 July 2012.
 161 C.K. Beveridge Squadron, Royal Canadian Air Cadets: 16 September 2017.
 527 Simonds Squadron, Royal Canadian Air Cadets: 16 September 2017.
 9 Rodney, Royal Canadian Sea Cadets: 16 September 2017.
 268 Bras d’Or, Royal Canadian Sea Cadets: 16 September 2017.
 311 Halifax, Royal Canadian Sea Cadets: 16 September 2017. 
 1691 Saint John, Royal Canadian Army Cadets: 16 September 2017.
 3034 Blue Mountain Rangers, Royal Canadian Army Cadets: 16 September 2017. 
 1777 Saint John West, Royal Canadian Army Cadets: 16 September 2017. 
 140 Kingston Peninsula, Royal Canadian Army Cadets: 16 September 2017.

 403 Helicopter Operational Training Squadron, RCAF: 13 June 2022.

Newfoundland and Labrador

Gander
 103 Search and Rescue Squadron, RCAF: 2 May 2017.

St. John's
 , RN: 16 May 1944.
 Royal Newfoundland Regiment: 1 July 1963.
 HMCS Cabot, RCN: 24 April 1985.
 , RCN: 22 June 1996.
 Royal Canadian Regiment: 19 June 2005.
 56 Engineer Squadron: 31 October 2009.
 Royal Newfoundland Constabulary: 18 August 2010

North West Territories

Yellowknife
 , RCN: 18 June 1999.

Nova Scotia

Annapolis Royal
 CSTC HMCS Acadia: 2004.

Halifax
 78th Highlanders: 1998. (Exercised Annually)
 The Princess Louise Fusiliers.
 Maritime Forces Atlantic.
 The Royal Canadian Regiment.

Kentville
 Land Force Atlantic Area Training Centre Aldershot: 14 October 2012.

Sydney
 29 Sydney Kiwanis and Band, Royal Canadian Air Cadets: 5 October 2018.
 45 A/M Edwards, Royal Canadian Air Cadets: 5 October 2018.
 562 Cabot, Royal Canadian Air Cadets: 5 October 2018.
 129 Caribou, Royal Canadian Sea Cadets: 5 October 2018.
 587 Whitney Pier, Royal Canadian Air Cadets: 5 October 2018.
 591 Dunlap, Royal Canadian Air Cadets: 5 October 2018.
 86 Dreadnought, Royal Canadian Sea Cadets: 5 October 2018.
 693 Sydney Rotary, Royal Canadian Air Cadets: 5 October 2018.
 3060 Coriano Ridge, Royal Canadian Army Cadets: 5 October 2018.
 2878 Cape Breton Highlanders, Royal Canadian Army Cadets: 5 October 2018.
 2 Sydney, Royal Canadian Sea Cadets: 5 October 2018.
 70 New Waterford, Royal Canadian Sea Cadets: 5 October 2018.

Yarmouth
 84th Independent Field Battery, RCA: 29 September 2018.

Ontario

Aurora
 142 St. Andrew's College Highland Cadet Corps Royal Canadian Army Cadets: 2005.

Barrie
 CFB Borden: 5 June 2016.

Belleville
 The Hastings and Prince Edward Regiment: 17 May 1964.
 8 Wing CFB Trenton: 1978.
 RCSCC Quinte 58: 2013.

Brampton
 The Lorne Scots Regiment : 1969.

Brantford
 56th Field Artillery Regiment, RCA: 1 October 1966.

Brockville
 The Brockville Rifles: 1 October 2016.

Cobourg
 Royal Canadian Horse Artillery: 1987.

Collingwood
 The Canadian Forces Military Police Academy: 21 June 2014.

Cumberland
 3018 Orleans Army Cadet Corps Royal Canadian Army Cadets: 1997.

Dufferin County
 The Lorne Scots Regiment : 1981.

Durham
 The Ontario Regiment: 1979

Elgin County
 31 Combat Engineer Regiment: 19 April 2008.

Elliot Lake
 696 Air Cadet Squadron Royal Canadian Air Cadets: 26 May 2019.

Guelph
 11th Field Regiment, RCA: 1966.

Halton Hills
 The Lorne Scots Regiment : 1987.

Hamilton
 , RCN
 Argyll and Sutherland Highlanders of Canada
 Royal Hamilton Light Infantry
 705 (Hamilton) Communication Squadron: 25 July 1978.
 31 Signal Regiment: 21 April 2012.

Kenora
 116 Independent Field Battery, RCA: 1985.

Kingston
 Royal Military College of Canada: 7 October 1976. (Freedom Exercised on 6 May 2012 and 5 May 2013) 
 Princess of Wales' Own Regiment: 1963. (Exercised on 4 May 2013)
 2nd Regiment, Royal Canadian Horse Artillery: 1983. (Exercised in 1996 and 26 May 2012)
 Communications and Electronics Branch: 31 August 2003.
1st Canadian Signal Regiment: 21 June 1975
 The Correctional Service of Canada: 31 May 2015.
 58 A/C A. Dwight Ross GC CBE CD, Royal Canadian Air Cadets: 28 May 2016.

London
 1st Battalion The Royal Canadian Regiment:  1980.
 , RCN: 31 October 1998.

Markham
 Button's Troop The Governor General's Horse Guards: 2 October 2010.
 351 Silver Star Royal Canadian Air Cadets Squadron: 27 May 2012.
 883 Air Commodore Leonard Birchall Royal Canadian Air Cadets Squadron: 27 May 2012.

Milton
 The Lorne Scots Regiment : 2009.

Mississauga
 The Lorne Scots Regiment : 2 July 2014.
 The Toronto Scottish Regiment: 20 September 2014.

Oakville
 The Lorne Scots Regiment : 1984.

Orillia
 99 Lynx Air Cadet Squadron Royal Canadian Air Cadets: 2005.

Oshawa
 The Ontario Regiment: 1966.

Ottawa
 14th Battalion of Kingston: 1894.
 1st Battalion The Royal Canadian Regiment: 1953.
 2nd Battalion The Canadian Guards: 1964.
 30th Field Artillery Regiment, RCA: 1968.
 The Cameron Highlanders of Ottawa: 24 May 1969.
 Governor General's Foot Guards: 1972.
 3rd Field Engineer Squadron: 1977.
 763 (Ottawa) Communications Regiment: 1978.
 The Canadian Grenadier Guards: 1979.
 , RCN: 1980.
 4th Princess Louise Dragoon Guards: 1981.
 28th Service Battalion: 1981.
 Princess Patricia's Canadian Light Infantry: 1985.
 Royal Canadian Sea Cadet Corps "Falkland": 1995.
 , RCN: 1996.
 3rd Battalion, The Royal Canadian Regiment: 1999.
 26/28 Service Battalion: 2009.
 33 Canadian Brigade Group: 2013.
 7 Intelligence Company: 5 June 2016.
 51 Squadron Aviation and Space Museum (RCAC): 19 June 2016.

Petawawa
 The Royal Canadian Dragoons: 15 June 2019.

Rideau Lakes
 Canadian Forces School of Communications and Electronics: 2008.

Sault Ste. Marie
 49th Field Artillery Regiment, RCA: 1 July 1967. 
 31 Service Battalion: 26 September 1987.
 2310 (Sault Ste. Marie) Squadron Royal Canadian Army Cadets: 1998.

Sioux Lookout
 CFS Sioux Lookout: July 1982.

Sudbury
 2nd Battalion The Irish Regiment of Canada: 9 May 2015.

Thunder Bay
 HMCS Griffon, RCN: 4 November 2018.
 18 Field Ambulance, RCMS: 4 November 2018.
 The Lake Superior Scottish Regiment: 4 November 2018.

Timmins
 The Algonquin Regiment (Northern Pioneers): 22 September 1977 (exercised on 22 September 2012)

Toronto
 3rd Battalion The Queen's Own Rifles of Canada: 1967.
 The Royal Regiment of Canada: 1962.
 The 48th Highlanders of Canada: 1966.
 The Royal Regiment of Canadian Artillery: 1966.
 7th Toronto Regiment, RCA: May 1966
 The Queen's York Rangers: 1975.
 709 (Toronto) Communications Regiment Signals Communications and Electronics Branch: 1978.
 The Toronto Scottish Regiment (Queen Elizabeth the Queen Mother's Own): 1982.
 400 Tactical Helicopter Squadron, RCAF: 1982.
 : 1983.
 : 1983.
 2nd Field Engineer Regiment: 1984. 
 32 Canadian Brigade Group: 1998.
 The Royal Canadian Dragoons: 2000.
 32 Signal Regiment, Royal Canadian Corps of Signals: 2017.

Trenton
 Trenton Air Cadet Summer Training Centre.
 704 Airforce City Royal Canadian Air Cadets Squadron.
8 Wing CFB Trenton: September 1967.

Uxbridge
 UNICEF Team Canada: 2008.

Waterloo
 31 Combat Engineer Regiment

Westport
 The Canadian Forces School of Communications and Electronics: 2008.

Whitchurch–Stouffville
 The Governor General's Horse Guards: 16 June 2012.

Windsor
 The Windsor Regiment: 1940.
 31 Service Battalion: 10 June 2017.
 , RCN: 2023.

Prince Edward Island

Charlottetown
 , RCN: 2015.
 The Royal Canadian Regiment.
 PEI Corps Royal Canadian Sea Cadets: 15 September 2018.

Quebec

Beaupré
 35 Combat Engineer Regiment: 4 May 2014.

Gatineau
 Le Régiment de Hull.

Granby
 Les Fusiliers de Sherbrooke

Huntingdon
 The Black Watch (Royal Highland Regiment) of Canada: 1998.

Matane
 Les Fusiliers du St-Laurent: 1985.

Mont-Joli
 Les Fusiliers du St-Laurent: 22 August 2010.

Montreal
 Canadian Grenadier Guards
 Le Régiment de Maisonneuve
 3rd Field Engineer Regiment (34 CER)
 The Royal Canadian Hussars
 The Black Watch (Royal Highland Regiment) of Canada: August 1992
 438 Tactical Helicopter Squadron

Ormstown
 The Black Watch (Royal Highland Regiment) of Canada: 1997

Port-Cartier
 The Correctional Service of Canada: 19 September 2018.

Quebec City
 Royal 22e Régiment: 1975 (Exercised 3 July 2006).
 , RCN: 6 May 1995.
 5e Régiment d'artillerie légère du Canada: 25 September 2004.

Rivière-du-Loup
 Les Fusiliers du St-Laurent: 1991.

Rimouski
 Les Fusiliers du St-Laurent: 1984.

Saint-Jean-sur-Richelieu
 Royal Military College Saint-Jean: 1 October 1977. (Exercised 1992, 1995, and 22 April 2012)

Sayabec
 Les Fusiliers du St-Laurent.

Sherbrooke
 Les Fusiliers de Sherbrooke
 Sherbrooke Hussars

Verdun
 The Black Watch (Royal Highland Regiment) of Canada: Fall 1999.

Westmount
 2nd Field Regiment, RCA: 24 October 2015. 
 The Royal Montreal Regiment.
 34 Signal Regiment 34 Canadian Brigade Group.

Saskatchewan

Moose Jaw
 15 Wing Moose Jaw: 1978.

Prince Albert
 The Saskatchewan Federal Penitentiary of the Correctional Service of Canada: 18 September 2017.

Regina
, RCN: 1978.
 734 Communication Squadron, Royal Canadian Corps of Signals: 1978.
, RCN: 1996.
Royal Regina Rifles: 2 June 2007.
Royal Canadian Mounted Police: 25 May 2007.
38 Service Battalion: 12 September 2015.
10 Field Artillery Regiment: 12 September 2015.
16 Field Ambulance: 12 September 2015.
15 Wing Moose Jaw: 12 September 2015.
38 Signal Regiment Detachment Regina: 12 September 2015.

Saskatoon
 , RCN: 1983.

Yorkton
 10th Field Artillery Regiment, RCA: 18 May 1985

Yukon

Dawson City
 The Canadian Rangers: 22 August 2022.

Whitehorse
  Whitehorse Cadet Summer Training Centre: 24 July 2009.

France

Erquinghem-Lys
 The Duke of Wellington's Regiment: 12 November 2005.

Moreuil
 Lord Strathcona's Horse (Royal Canadians): 31 March 2018.

Vis-en-Artois
 The Cameron Highlanders of Ottawa (Duke of Edinburgh's Own): 8 May 2019.

Germany

Bergen
 111 Provost Company Royal Military Police

Berlin (Spandau)
 7 Flight Army Air Corps: 22 October 1982.
 The Queen's Lancashire Regiment: 16 August 1993.

Celle
 14 Signal Regiment: 10 July 1987.

Hamelin
 The Corps of Royal Engineers: 3 June 1977.

Hamm
 617 Tank Transporter Unit The Royal Corps of Transport: 6 September 1974.

Paderborn
 39th Regiment, Royal Artillery: 15 March 1980.
 Princess of Wales’s Royal Regiment 3 July 2018

Rheda-Wiedenbrück
 26th Regiment, Royal Artillery: 10 August 2017.

Stadt Soest
 3 Regiment Army Air Corps: 8 May 1993.

Tiergarten
 The Royal Military Police: 5 October 1990.

Xanten
 101 Provost Company Royal Military Police: 15 March 1982.

Italy

Ortona
 The Royal 22nd Regiment: 14 April 1993.

Malawi

Zomba
 Changalume Barracks: 31 March 2017.

New Zealand

Auckland Region

Auckland
Auckland Regiment (Countess of Ranfurly's own):19 April 1953
3rd (Auckland (Countess of Ranfurly's own) and Northland) Battalion, Royal New Zealand Infantry Regiment: 9 March 1966

Howick
 4 Signal Squadron, Royal New Zealand Corps of Signals 14 August 1982

Papakura
 Papakura Military Camp: 6 December 1964
 11(A) Battery, 1st Field Regiment, Royal New Zealand Artillery: 9 September 1995

Takapuna
 Land Forces Command: 9 February 1982

Bay of Plenty

Rotorua
 Hauraki Regiment: 26 January 1963
 6th (Hauraki) Battalion, Royal New Zealand Infantry Regiment: February 1966

Tauranga
 6th (Hauraki) Battalion, Royal New Zealand Infantry Regiment: 20 September 1969

Canterbury

Akaroa
Ready Reaction Force Engineer Squadron: 25 October 1974

Ashburton
 2nd (Canterbury, and Nelson-Marlborough and West Coast) Battalion, Royal New Zealand Infantry Regiment: 13 December 1982

Christchurch 
Canterbury Regiment: 15 November 1959
 2nd (Canterbury, and Nelson-Marlborough and West Coast) Battalion, Royal New Zealand Infantry Regiment: 17 Janruary 1966

Lyttleton
3 Field Troop, Royal New Zealand Engineers: 10 December 1994

Rolleston
Burnham Military Camp: 12 April 2005

Timaru
Canterbury Regiment: 5 April 1959
 2nd (Canterbury, and Nelson-Marlborough and West Coast) Battalion, Royal New Zealand Infantry Regiment: 17 Janruary 1966

Gisborne District

Gisborne
 , RNZN: 28 November 2020.
 7th (Wellington (City of Wellington's Own) and Hawke's Bay) Battalion, Royal New Zealand Infantry Regiment: 23 February 1979

Hawke's Bay

Hastings
 Queen Alexandra's Mounted Rifles: 29 August 1965
 4th Armoured Regiment (Wellington East Coast): 7 September 1958

Napier
 Hawke's Bay Regiment: 17 March 1952
 7th (Wellington (City of Wellington's Own) and Hawke's Bay) Battalion, Royal New Zealand Infantry Regiment: 30 November 1964

Manawatu-Wanganui

Feilding
 2nd Health Support Battalion, Royal New Zealand Army Medical Corps: 11 November 2006

Foxton
 21 Supply Company, 2nd Combat Service Support Battalion: 11 December 2010

Dannevirke
 1st Battalion, Royal New Zealand Infantry Regiment: 7 October 2016

Levin
 The Corps of Royal New Zealand Engineers: 7 February 1959.

Palmerston North
 Linton Military Camp: 12 October 1956

Raetihi
 4th Logistic Battalion: 18 February 1995

Taihape 

 Royal New Zealand Electrical and Mechanical Engineers: 14 December 1973

Taumarunui
 Royal New Zealand Service Corps: 8 October 1966

Wanganui
 Wellington West Coast and Taranaki Regiment: 24 January 1961
 5th (Wellington West Coast and Taranaki) Battalion, Royal New Zealand Infantry Regiment: 9 November 1964
 Queen Alexandra's Mounted Rifles: 30 September 1983

Marlborough

Blenheim
 2nd (Canterbury, and Nelson-Marlborough and West Coast) Battalion, Royal New Zealand Infantry Regiment: 28 August 1990

Nelson

Nelson
 1st Battalion Nelson, Marlborough, West Coast Regiment: 1958.
 2nd (Canterbury, and Nelson-Marlborough and West Coast) Battalion, Royal New Zealand Infantry Regiment: 29 November 1969

Northland

Kaitaia
 Northland Regiment: 25 March 1955

Whangarei
3rd (Auckland (Countess of Ranfurly's own) and Northland) Battalion, Royal New Zealand Infantry Regiment: 8 November 1966

Otago

Dunedin
 Otago and Southland Regiment: 21 January 1961
 4th (Otago and Southland) Battalion, Royal New Zealand Infantry Regiment: 19 October 1964
 2nd Squadron, New Zealand Scottish Regiment: 15 March 1977
 2nd/4th Battalion, Royal New Zealand Infantry Regiment: 27 September 2016.

Southland

Invercargil
Otago and Southland Regiment: 22 January 1959
 4th (Otago and Southland) Battalion, Royal New Zealand Infantry Regiment: 27 August 1964

Taranaki

Hawera
 5th (Wellington West Coast and Taranaki) Battalion, Royal New Zealand Infantry Regiment: 31 January 1972

New Plymouth
 Wellington West Coast and Taranaki Regiment: 28 February 1960
 5th (Wellington West Coast and Taranaki) Battalion, Royal New Zealand Infantry Regiment: 16 November 1964
 5th/7th Battalion, Royal New Zealand Infantry Regiment
 8 (City of New Plymouth) Squadron, New Zealand Air Training Corps
 City of New Plymouth Unit, New Zealand Cadet Corps: 21 October 2018

Stratford
 5th (Wellington West Coast and Taranaki) Battalion, Royal New Zealand Infantry Regiment: 9 July 1996

Waikato

Hamilton, New Zealand
 Waikato Mounted Rifles: 2 October 1960
 4th Medium Regiment, Royal New Zealand Artillery: 2 October 1960
 2nd Armoured Squadron, Royal New Zealand Armoured Corps: October 1964
 Queen Alexandra's Mounted Rifles: 3 September 1971

Ngaruawahia
 Hopuhopu Camp: 7 December 1963

Paeroa
 6th (Hauraki) Battalion, Royal New Zealand Infantry Regiment: 12 February 1983

Raglan
 16th Field Regiment, Royal New Zealand Artillery: 25 April 1969

Taupo
 Regular Force Cadet School: 31 January 1970
 New Zealand Officer Cadet Corps: 7 March 1998

Te Awamutu
 1st Field Ambulance, Royal New Zealand Army Medical Corps: 20 December 1993
 1st Health Company, Royal New Zealand Army Medical Corps: 30 September 2003

Thames
 New Zealand Special Air Service: 27 September 1969

Tokoroa
 6th (Hauraki) Battalion, Royal New Zealand Infantry Regiment: 20 March 1990

Wellington Region

Featherston
 5th/7th Battalion, Royal New Zealand Infantry Regiment: 1 December 2018

Wellington
 Wellington Regiment (City of Wellington's Own): 14 October 1938
 7th (Wellington (City of Wellington's Own) and Hawke's Bay) Battalion, Royal New Zealand Infantry Regiment: 3 November 1969
 22(D) Battery, 2nd Field Regiment, Royal New Zealand Artillery: 11 December 1981

Upper Hutt
 Trentham Military Camp: 31 October 1951

West Coast

Greymouth
 2nd (Canterbury, and Nelson-Marlborough and West Coast) Battalion, Royal New Zealand Infantry Regiment: 3 June 1988

Rhodesia

Bulawayo
 Rhodesian African Rifles: 5 September 1964.
 Royal Rhodesia Regiment: 5 September 1964.

Salisbury
 Rhodesia Regiment: July 1968
 Rhodesian Air Force: 25 May 1971.
 Rhodesian Light Infantry: 25 July 1975.

South Africa

Barberton
 The South African Irish Regiment: 2009.
 The Transvaal Scottish Regiment: 2009.
 The Witwatersrand Rifles Regiment: 2009.
 The Regiment Botha: 2009.

Cape Town
 The Cape Town Highlanders Regiment: 1967.
 The Cape Town Rifles: 1967.

Mahikeng
 South African Navy: 15 September 2012.

Makhanda (formerly Grahamstown)
 The First City Regiment: 4 September 1962.
 The 6 South African Infantry Battalion: 31 March 1967.

Johannesburg
 The Transvaal Scottish Regiment: 13 December 1952.
 The Witwatersrand Rifles Regiment: 24 April 1954.
 The Rand Light Infantry: 27 September 1955.
 The Light Horse Regiment: 5 September 1959. 
 The Transvaal Horse Artillery: 17 March 1963.
 SAS Rand, SAN: 1963.
 The South African Irish Regiment: 19 November 1966.
 The Regiment Paul Kruger: 11 October 1969. 
 The Johannesburg Regiment: 27 February 1971.
 The 2 Squadron, SAAF:  16 March 1984.
 21 South African Infantry Battalion: 24 June 1986.
 Area Military Health Unit Gauteng South African Military Health Service: 24 April 1990.
 6 Light Anti-Aircraft Regiment: 31 October 2002.

United Kingdom

British Overseas Territories

Bermuda

Hamilton
 The Royal Bermuda Regiment: 13 November 2015.

Falkland Islands
 The Royal Marines: 8 December 1976.
 The British Army: 14 June 2012.
 The Royal Navy: 14 June 2012.
 The Royal Air Force: 14 June 2012.
 The Falkland Islands Defence Force: 14 June 2012.

Gibraltar
 The Royal Gibraltar Regiment: 25 September 1971.
 The Corps of Royal Engineers: 6 March 1972.
 The Royal Regiment of Artillery: 29 April 1981.
 , RN: 27 April 1991.
 The Royal Marines: 28 October 1996.
 The Royal Navy: 4 August 2004.
 The Royal Gibraltar Police: 26 September 2015.
 1st Battalion The Royal Anglian Regiment: 26 November 2016.
 RAF Gibraltar: 2 April 2018.

Crown dependencies

Bailiwick of Jersey
 The Royal Hampshire Regiment: 9 May 1992.

Isle of Man

Douglas
 RAF Jurby: 7 July 1955.

Ramsey
 , RN: 24 April 2010.

England

Abingdon
 RAF Abingdon: 1955.
 12 Regiment, RLC: 8 December 2010.

Albrighton
 RAF Cosford: 1998.

Aldeburgh
 3 Regiment Army Air Corps: 23 June 2012.

Aldershot
 The Hampshire Regiment: 11 September 1945.
 The Canadian Army Overseas: 26 September 1945.

 The Parachute Regiment: 1957.
 The Army Physical Training Corps: 1960.
 The Corps of Royal Engineers: 20 May 1965.
 The Army Catering Corps: 1971.
 The Queen Alexandra's Royal Army Nursing Corps: 27 June 1973.
 The Royal Army Medical Corps: 27 June 1973.
 The Royal Army Dental Corps: 27 June 1973.

Amber Valley
 The Mercian Regiment: 26 January 2010.

Amesbury
 MoD Boscombe Down: 8 April 2018.

Appleby-in-Westmorland
 2nd Battalion The Duke of Lancaster's Regiment: 18 July 2017.

Arundel
 The Royal Sussex Regiment: 1954.

Ashford
 The Intelligence Corps: 16 May 1979
 The Queen's Regiment: 13 June 1987
 The Princess of Wales's Royal Regiment: 9 September 1992
 133 Field Company REME (V): 7 May 2009

Aylesbury Vale
 RAF Halton: October 2010.

Barking and Dagenham
 The Royal Anglian Regiment: February 2010.

Barnet
 , RN: 20 December 1941. (Awarded by the East Barnet Urban District Council)
 , RN: 14 March 1942. (Awarded by the East Barnet Urban District Council) 
 , RN: 28 March 1942.  (Awarded by the Friern Barnet Urban District Council)
 The Queen's Regiment: 16 April 1970.
 240 (Hertfordshire) Squadron Royal Corps of Transport (Volunteers): 21 October 1979.
 "B" Company 6/7 (Volunteer) Battalion Queen's Regiment: 1979.
 3 Company 10th (Volunteer) Battalion Parachute Regiment: 1979.  
 The Corps of Royal Engineers: 24 July 1982.  
 RAF Hendon: 29 July 1986. 
 Royal Logistic Corps, Postal and Courier Services: 19 April 1994.
 The Princess of Wales's Royal Regiment: 23 February 1998.

 The Royal Air Force Museum: 26 October 2018.

Barnoldswick
 The Yorkshire Regiment: 8 September 2013.

Barnsley
 The Light Dragoons
 The Yorkshire Regiment

Barnstaple
 The Commando Logistic Regiment, RM: 1 August 2018.

Barrow-in-Furness
 The Royal Navy Submarine Service: 11 June 2001.
 The Duke of Lancaster's Regiment.

Basildon
 The Royal Anglian Regiment: 9 June 2011.

Basingstoke
 The Royal Hampshire Regiment: 16 July 1966.
 RAF Odiham: July 1968.

Bath
 21st Signal Regiment (Air Support): November 2011

Battersea
 4th Battalion The Queen's Royal Surrey Regiment (TA): 1964.

Bedale
 RAF Leeming: 5 August 2022.

Bedford
 Bedfordshire and Hertfordshire Regiment: November 1955
 RAF Cardington: 16 July 1959.
 287 Regiment Royal Artillery: 5 May 1963.  
 1st Battalion Royal Anglian Regiment: 1980.
 201 (Hertfordshire and Bedfordshire Yeomanry) Battery Royal Artillery (Volunteers): 3 May 1986.
 RAF Henlow: 26 September 1992.
 774th USAF Airbase Group: 15 December 1994.
 134 (Bedford) Squadron Air Training Corps: 1 August 1999.

Berwick-upon-Tweed
 Coldstream Guards: 25 July 2000.

Bethnal Green
 , RN: 1942.  
 114 (1st London) Army Engineer Regiment (TA): 27 April 1961.

Bexley
 17th Depot Regiment Royal Artillery
 265 Support Squadron Kent and Sharpshooters Yeomanry: May 2010.

Beverley
 RAF Leconfield: 2 May 1968.

Bicester
 1 Regiment, RLC: 21 July 2018.

Birkenhead
 4th Battalion The Cheshire Regiment: 1960.
 The Royal Army Service Corps: 1 May 1965.

Birmingham
 Royal Warwickshire Regiment: 1946.
 Grenadier Guards
 Coldstream Guards
 Scots Guards
 Welsh Guards
 Irish Guards
 Special Air Service
 35 (South Midlands) Signal Regiment Royal Corps of Signals (TA): 12 September 1970.
 The Royal Regiment of Fusiliers: 7 May 1975.
 , RN: 11 May 1978. 
 The Queen's Own Hussars: 4 October 1983.
 The Royal Marines: 16 March 2017.
 , RNR.
 , RN.
 RAF Cosford: 19 May 2018.

Blackburn with Darwen
 The East Lancashire Regiment: 5 February 1948.
 The Lancashire Regiment: 6 November 1958.
 The Queen's Lancashire Regiment: 25 March 1970.
 The Duke of Lancaster's Regiment: 1 July 2006.

Blackpool
 R (Blackpool) Battery 288 (2nd West Lancashire) Light Anti-Aircraft Regiment Royal Artillery (TA): 1961.  
 , RN: 1990.
 The 12th Regiment Royal Artillery: 9 July 2005.
 The Duke of Lancaster's Regiment: July 2017.

Blandford Forum
 Queen's Gurkha Signals: 11 September 2005.

Bolton
 253rd Regiment Royal Artillery (TA): 18 April 1964.
 5th Battalion Loyal Regiment (North Lancashire) (TA): 18 April 1964.
 , RN: 14 April 1973.
 216 (The Bolton Artillery) Battery 103rd (Lancashire Artillery Volunteers) Regiment Royal Artillery: 18 May 1994.
 1st Battalion The Duke of Lancaster's Regiment: 14 March 2009.

Bordon
 The Royal Electrical and Mechanical Engineers: 27 June 2015.

Boroughbridge

 9 Regiment Army Air Corps: 2 May 1992.
 6 Regiment Royal Logistic Corps: 7 May 2018.

Boston
 RAF Coningsby: 16 May 1963.

Bournemouth
 The Royal Hampshire Regiment: 13 September 1945.

Bracknell Forest
 Royal Military Academy Sandhurst: 13 July 1997.

Bradford
 The 70th (West Riding) Royal Field Regiment Royal Artillery (TA): 5 September 1945.
 The Duke of Wellington's Regiment: 26 April 1996.
 The Yorkshire Regiment: 25 June 2010.

Brampton
 RAF Spadeadam: 18 June 2017.

Brentford and Chiswick
 264th Field Regiment Royal Artillery: 5 May 1951.
 917th Company Royal Army Service Corps: 5 May 1951.
 21st A A (Mixed) Signal Squadron, Royal Corps of Signals (TA): 5 May 1951.
 44th (Home Counties) Infantry Division Signals Regiment, Royal Corps of Signals (TA): 5 May 1951.
 53rd Squadron, Royal Signals Army Cadet Force: 5 May 1951.

Brentwood
124 (Essex) Transport Squadron, RLC: 2015.

Bridgnorth
 RAF Bridgnorth: 12 April 1950.

Brighton and Hove
 The Royal Sussex Regiment: 27 October 1944 (Borough of Brighton).
 The Queen's Regiment: 31 December 1966 (Borough of Brighton).

 The Princess of Wales’s Royal Regiment: 1996.

Bristol
 The Rifles: 2007.
 39 Signal Regiment: 2019.

Bromley
 RAF Biggin Hill: 5 October 1980.

Bromsgrove
 The Mercian Regiment: 20 January 2011.

Broxbourne
 The Royal Anglian Regiment: 2 July 2017.

Broxtowe
 170 (Infrastructure Support) Engineer group Royal Engineers: 2010.

Burghfield
 The Royal British Legion: 18 June 2013.

Burnley
 , RN: 1989.

Burton upon Trent
 The North Staffordshire Regiment: 1946.
 The Staffordshire Yeomanry: 1946.

Bury
 207 (Manchester) Field Hospital Royal Army Medical Corps: 20 October 2017.

Bury St. Edmunds
 , RN: 14 June 2017.
 TS St Edmund Sea Cadet Corps: 14 June 2017.

Calderdale
 The Duke of Wellington's Regiment: 27 July 2002.

Cambridge
 The Cambridgeshire Regiment: 29 September 1946.
 104 (City of Cambridge) Squadron Air Training Corps: 1999.

Cannock Chase
 The Mercian Regiment: 7 November 2012.

Canterbury
 5th Battalion The Royal Regiment of Scotland: 27 November 2008.

Carlisle
 RAF Spadeadam: 2 June 2018.

Carterton
 RAF Brize Norton: 21 April 2016.

Charnwood
 2nd Battalion The Royal Anglian Regiment: 4 September 2006.
 203 (Loughborough) Squadron The 158 (Royal Anglian) Transport Regiment: 15 April 2010.
 The Royal Logistic Corps: April 2010.

Chelsea
 40th Signal Regiment, Royal Signals (Middlesex Yeomanry) (TA): 21 December 1959.
 London Irish Rifles, The Royal Ulster Rifles (TA): 21 December 1959. 
 101 (London) Field Engineer Regiment: 26 April 1960.

Cheltenham
 Central Flying School, RAF: 2 May 1962.
 RAF Innsworth: October 1986.

 Government Communications Headquarters: 13 May 2019.

Cheshire East
 The Mercian Regiment: 27 May 2010.

Cheshire West and Chester
 The Mercian Regiment: July 2008.

Chester
 The Cheshire Regiment: 1948.
 The Cheshire Yeomanry: 1996.
 , RN: 2003.
 1st Battalion The Mercian Regiment: 26 March 2008.
 1st Battalion The Royal Welsh

Chesterfield
 The Sherwood Foresters: 17 July 1946.
 The Worcestershire and Sherwood Foresters Regiment: 27 July 1970.
 , RN: 12 February 1974.  
 The Mercian Regiment: 12 December 2007.
 575 Field Squadron Royal Engineers (V): 20 July 2011.
 The 9th/12th Royal Lancers: 10 February 2012.

Chichester
 Royal Sussex Regiment and its respective successors, the Queen's Royal Regiment and the Princess of Wales's Royal Regiment: 30 June 1951.
 RAF Tangmere, a Royal Air Force station which played a crucial role in the Battle of Britain: 1960
 The Royal Military Police: 7 January 1981.

Chippenham
 RAF Rudloe Manor: 1992.
 Duke of Edinburgh's Royal Regiment: 1994.
 9 Regiment, Royal Logistic Corps: 19 January 2012.
 1st Battalion The Rifles: 19 January 2012.

Chorley
 The Duke of Lancaster's Regiment: 2007.
 3 Medical Regiment, RAMC: 6 June 2015.
 The Lancashire Constabulary.

Christchurch
 The Royal Hampshire Regiment: 19 October 1987.
 The Devonshire and Dorset Regiment.
 The Rifles: 1 May 2008.

Colchester
 The Essex Regiment: 3 April 1946. 
 3rd Battalion The Royal Anglian Regiment: 27 April 1977.
 156 Provost Company Royal Military Police: 8 April 1998.
 16 Air Assault Brigade: February 2008.

Congleton
 The Cheshire Yeomanry: 1906.
 The Cheshire Regiment: 1969.

Copeland
 Army Cadet Force: 27 June 2010.
 Sea Cadet Corps: 27 June 2010.
 Air Training Corps: 27 June 2010.

Corby
 Royal Anglian Regiment: 3 May 2012.

Corsham
 Ministry of Defence Corsham: 26 June 2010.

Cotswold
 29 Regiment RLC: 10 March 2005.

Coventry
 , RN: 16 October 2014.

Crewe
 2nd Battalion The Mercian Regiment: 19 February 2015.

Crewe and Nantwich
 The Cheshire Regiment: 1986.
  1st Battalion The Mercian Regiment (Cheshire)

Croydon
 41 (Princess Louise's Kensington) Signal Squadron Royal Corps of Signals (Volunteers): 1993.  
 151 Regiment RLC (Volunteers): 1993.  
 2 Company 10th Battalion The Parachute Regiment (Volunteers): 1993.
 "C" Squadron Kent and Sharpshooters Yeomanry The Royal Yeomanry: 1993.
 2nd Battalion The Rifles: 2010.

Dacorum
 RAF Halton: 2009.
 The Royal Anglian Regiment: 24 September 2014

Darlington
 The Light Infantry: 1996.
 The Rifles: 17 September 2010.

Dartmouth
 Britannia Royal Naval College: 1955.

Deal
 The Royal Marines: 14 February 1945.

Derby
 The Royal Navy Submarine Service: 28 April 2002.
 The Mercian Regiment: 2007.

Dereham
 1st The Queen's Dragoon Guards: 28 June 2022.

Diss
 The Royal Anglian Regiment: 7 November 2012.

Doncaster
 The King's Own Yorkshire Light Infantry: 1945.
 RAF Finningley: 1975.
 The Rifles: 8 September 2007.

 The Coldstream Guards: 15 July 2021.

Dudley
 Royal Mercian and Lancastrian Yeomanry (TA): 30 June 2012.
 RAF Cosford: 4 December 2017.
 63 Military Intelligence Company Intelligence Corps: 30 June 2019.

Durham
 The Rifles: 2007.
 , RN: 2010.  
 607 Squadron, RAF: 6 December 2017.

Ealing
 562 (Transport) Squadron 151 (London) Transport Regiment: 16 April 2013

Eastbourne
 The Royal Sussex Regiment: 1951.

Eastleigh
 The Royal Hampshire Regiment: 14 September 1991.
 The Princess of Wales's Royal Regiment: September 1992.

East Staffordshire
 The Staffordshire Fire and Rescue Service: 1998.

Eccles
 911 Company 42nd (East Lancashire) Infantry Division (TA): 25 April 1964.

Ellesmere Port and Neston
 The Cheshire Regiment: June 1986.
 The Mercian Regiment: 2007.

Ely
 The Cambridgeshire Regiment.
 D (Cambridgeshire) Company 6 Volunteer Battalion The Royal Anglian Regiment: 27 March 1977.

Epping Forest District
 56 Squadron RAF: June 2018

Epsom and Ewell
 135 Independent Geographic Squadron Royal Engineers (Reserve): 1999.
 The Princess of Wales's Royal Regiment: 2010.

Exeter
 The Royal Marines: April 1977
 243 (The Wessex) Field Hospital (V): July 2002 
 The Rifles (formerly The Devonshire and Dorset Regiment): June 2007   
 The Coldstream Guards: July 2011
 RAF Brize Norton: 21 October 2013.
 , RN: March 2014

Falmouth
 , Royal Fleet Auxiliary: 25 April 2007.

Fareham
 , RN: 2 July 1974.

Finchley
 , RN: 1942.
 461 (Middlesex) Heavy Anti-Aircraft Regiment Royal Artillery (Territorial Army): 26 February 1951.  
 , RN: 14 August 1963.

Folkestone
 2nd Battalion The Royal Gurkha Rifles: 18 June 2009.
 The Canadian Armed Forces Serving Within the United Kingdom: 4 July 2018.

Gateshead
 72 Engineer Regiment: 9 July 2011.

Gedling
 2nd Battalion The Mercian Regiment: 20 October 2010.

Gillingham, Dorset
 Devonshire and Dorset Regiment: 1998
 The Rifles: 2007
 Gillingham Platoon of the Dorset Army Cadet Force: 2010

Gillingham, Kent
 The Royal Engineers: 21 August 1953.

Gloucester
 RAF Innsworth: 7 April 1960. 
 14 Signal Regiment: 28 April 1966.
 The Rifles: 2 April 2011.

Gosport
 The Engineering Training School Royal Navy: 17 April 1975.
 40 Commando Royal Marines: 10 November 2005.
 33 Field Hospital 2nd Medical Brigade RAMC: 23 April 2010.
 , RN: 22 March 2013.

Grantham
 RAF Spitalgate:  June 1952.

Gravesend
  The Princess of Wales’s Royal Regiment: 19 July 2011.

Great Aycliffe
 124 Recovery Company (V) Royal Electrical and Mechanical Engineers: October 1987.

Great Yarmouth
 The 1st East Anglian Regiment: 1963.
 The Royal Anglian Regiment: 1964.
 , RN: 1984.
 The Great Yarmouth and Gorleston Lifeboat Station, RNLI: 1984.
 The Caister Volunteer Lifeboat Service: 1984.  

 901 Troop Royal Marines Cadets: 28 September 2012.
 The Royal British Legion (Great Yarmouth Branch): 2 November 2012.
 , RN: 11 June 2013.

Greenwich
 The Royal Regiment of Artillery: 24 May 1966
 The Royal Naval College: 24 May 1966

Grimsby
 , RN: 2001.

Guildford
 Queen's Royal Regiment: September 1945.
 Queen's Royal Surrey Regiment: 1959.
 1st Battalion The Queen's Regiment: 1 January 1967.
 Women's Royal Army Corps: 22 June 1988.
 Princess of Wales's Royal Regiment: 1992.

 Army Training Centre Pirbright: 7 March 2017.

Hackney
 3 Military Intelligence Battalion (Volunteers): 2008.

Halifax
 The Duke of Wellington's Regiment: 18 June 1945.

Halton
 The Cheshire Regiment: 1988.

Hammersmith and Fulham
 Headquarters Squadron 31 Signal Regiment (Volunteers): 1981.
 The Royal Yeomanry (TA): 26 January 2011.

Harborough
 The Royal Anglian Regiment: 7 April 2011.

Harlow
 The Essex Yeomanry: 25 April 2009
 The Royal Anglian Regiment: 27 September 2012.

Harpenden
 The Royal Anglian Regiment: 12 September 2013.

Harrogate
 The Army Foundation College.

Harrow
 131 Independent Commando Squadron, Corps of Royal Engineers (Volunteers): 10 March 1983.
 47 (Middlesex Yeomanry) Signal Squadron, 31st (Greater London) Signal Regiment Royal Corps of Signals: 10 March 1983.
 257 (Southern) General Hospital Royal Army Medical Corps (Volunteers): 10 March 1983.
 RAF Stanmore Park: 20 October 1988.
 RAF Bentley Priory: 20 October 1988.
  Roxeth & Harrow Coy, Church Lads' & Church Girls' Brigade 20 October 1994
  Royal British Legion (Harrow Branch): 18 July 1996.
  1454 (Harrow) Squadron Air Training Corps: 1 May 2014.

Hartlepool
 The Rifles: 19 March 2015.

Haslingden
 The Queen's Lancashire Regiment: 1964.
 The Duke of Lancaster's Regiment: 2006.

Hastings
 The Royal Sussex Regiment: 1947.

Havant
 47th Regiment Royal Artillery: 3 July 2012.

Havering
 The Royal Anglian Regiment: Was in place as of September 2014.

Haverhill
 The Royal Anglian Regiment: 18 June 2019.

Heddon-on-the-Wall
 Humberside and South Yorkshire Squadron Army Cadet Force: 1960.

Helston
 HMS Seahawk, RN: 1958.

Hendon
 The Middlesex Regiment: 22 October 1955.

High Peak
 The Worcestershire and Sherwood Foresters Regiment: 1974. 
 The Mercian Regiment: 18 December 2007.
 The Royal British Legion (6 Local Branches): 7 November 2018.

High Wycombe
 RAF High Wycombe: 1971.
 7th Battalion The Rifles (TA): 9 June 2013.

Hillingdon
 RAF Uxbridge: 1960.
 RAF Northolt: 2000.
 47 (Middlesex Yeomanry) Signal Squadron: 2007

Hinckley and Bosworth
 2nd Battalion The Royal Anglian Regiment: 20 May 1978.

Hornsey
 7th Battalion The Middlesex Regiment: 10 May 1948.

Hounslow
 2nd Battalion the Royal Regiment of Fusiliers: 2009.
 The Royal British Legion (7 Local Branches): 4 April 2017.

Hove
 The Royal Sussex Regiment: 1958.

Huddersfield
 The Duke of Wellington's Regiment: 2 July 1952.
 The Yorkshire Regiment: 25 October 2008.

Hunstanton
 67th Special Operations Squadron, USAF: 4 October 2014.

Huntingdon
 RAF Wyton: 17 September 1955.
 RAF Brampton: 1995.
 The Royal Anglian Regiment: 21 January 2010.
 The Princess of Wales's Royal Regiment: 23 November 2017. 
 The 501st Combat Support Wing, USAF: 21 September 2018.

Huntingdonshire
 RAF Wyton: 17 August 2013.

Hyndburn
 The Queen's Lancashire Regiment: 29 June 2002.

Ilford
 The Essex Regiment: 14 June 1947.
 The 3rd East Anglian Regiment (16th/44th Foot): 9 September 1958.

Ipswich
 1st Battalion The Suffolk Regiment: 1953.
 , RN: 27 July 1971.  
 : 6 February 2011.
 The Royal Anglian Regiment: September 2011.
 4 Regiment Army Air Corps: 22 March 2002.
 202 (Ipswich) Transport Squadron 158 (Royal Anglian) Transport Regiment (Volunteers)

Isle of Wight
 Isle of Wight Troop 266 Port Squadron 165 Port and Maritime Regiment Royal Logistic Corps: 28 November 2015.

Islington
  The Honourable Artillery Company: October 2009
 The Islington Veterans' Association: March 2015.
 The Islington and Holloway Fire Stations of the London Fire Brigade: March 2018.

Keighley
 The Yorkshire Regiment: 2011.

Kendal
 The Border Regiment: 25 October 1947.
 The King's Own Royal Border Regiment: 1 October 1959.
 The Duke of Lancaster's Regiment: 1 July 2006.

Kensington
 The Army Phantom Signal Regiment: 6 October 1959.

Kensington and Chelsea
 The Royal Hospital Chelsea: 28 June 2006.
 31 (City of London) Signal Regiment (V)
 Kensington Regiment (Princess Louise's) Signal Squadron 38 Signal Regiment
 "D" Company (London Irish Rifles) The London Regiment
 10 Company 4th Battalion, Parachute Regiment 
 21 Special Air Services Regiment (Artists Rifles) (V)
 256 (City of London) Field Hospital (V)
 The Royal Yeomanry
 The University of London Air Squadron (V)
 University of London Royal Naval Unit

Kettering
 The Royal Anglian Regiment: 14 December 2011.

Kidderminster
 The Mercian Regiment

King's Lynn and West Norfolk
 RAF Marham: 1981.
 The Royal Anglian Regiment.
 42F (King’s Lynn) Squadron Air Training Corps: 11 October 2014.
 67th Special Operations Squadron USAF: 4 October 2014.

Kingston upon Hull
 The East Yorkshire Regiment: 1 June 1944.
 The Prince of Wales's Own Regiment of Yorkshire: 5 June 1958.
 The Yorkshire Regiment: 16 November 2006.
 440 (Humber) light Anti-Aircraft Regiment Royal Artillery (TA): 28 June 1960.
 440 (Humber) light Anti-Aircraft Regiment Royal Artillery (Territorials): 3 August 1967.
 RAF Patrington: 16 May 1970.
 150(N) Transport Regiment Royal Corps of Transport (Volunteers): 1 February 1990.
 RRH Staxton Wold: 3 March 1994.
 150 (Yorkshire) Transport Regiment Royal Logistic Corps (Volunteers): 3 March 1994.
 , RN: 3 March 1994.
 250th Field Ambulance (Volunteer Unit): 15 July 1999.
 Hull Unit Sea Cadet Corps: 27 February 2014.

Kingston upon Thames
  The Princess of Wales’s Royal Regiment
 256 (City of London) Field Hospital (Volunteers): March 2009

Kirklees
 3rd Battalion The Yorkshire Volunteers: 25 March 1979.
 4th Battalion The Yorkshire Regiment: 25 October 2008.

Knowsley
  The Duke of Lancaster's Regiment: 12 October 2009.

Lancaster
 King's Own Royal Regiment: 29 August 1953.

Ledbury
 , RN: 2007.

Leeds
 , RN:  4 November 1941.
 RAF Church Fenton: 1971.
 , RN: 25 October 1973.
 5th Battalion The Rifles: 1 August 2009.
 4th Battalion The Parachute Regiment: 9 December 2020.
 Leeds Rifles
 Leeds Pals
 51st (2nd Yorkshire West Riding) Regiment of Foot

Leicester
 The 9th/12th Royal Lancers: 30 June 2011.

Leighton–Linslade
 RAF Stanbridge: 27 April 1987.
 1003 (Leighton Buzzard) Squadron Air Training Corps: 29 January 2001.

Lewes
 The Royal Sussex Regiment: 1953.

Lewisham
 1475 (Dulwich) Squadron Air Training Corps (Date unknown)

Lichfield
 The Staffordshire Regiment: 7 November 1960.
 3rd Battalion The Mercian Regiment: 2007.
 The Depot, The Prince of Wales' Division, Lichfield: 25 April 1981.
 The Army Training Regiment, Lichfield: 12 April 2000.
 The Joint Medical Command, Whittington Barracks: 12 September 2011.

 DMS Whittington: 28 September 2016.

Lincoln
 RAF Waddington: 25 April 1959.
 RAF Scampton: 14 May 1993.
 2nd Battalion The Royal Anglian Regiment: 1997.
 The Grenadier Guards: 8 May 2008.

Liskeard
 The Royal British Legion (Liskeard Branch): 14 August 2022.

Littlehampton
 30 Commando, RM: 5 October 2013.

Liverpool
 Duke of Lancaster's Regiment: 14 September 2008.
 War Widows Association (Merseyside Branch): 1 December 2014.
 208 (3rd West Lancashire) Battery 103rd (Lancashire Artillery Volunteers) Regiment Royal Artillery: 14 October 2017.
 8th Engineer Brigade, RE: 11 December 2020.
 The Parachute Regiment Association (Liverpool Branch): 24 October 2021.

City of London

Freedom of the City of London is a status into which only persons are admitted. The following units of HM Forces hold City Privileged Regiment status and consequently have the right to march through the City of London with drums beating, bayonets fixed and colours unfurled. Military units honoured in this fashion may only enter the City when the permission of the Lord Mayor of London has been sought and granted. All military units entering the City of London do so by permission of the Lord Mayor, they do not have 'the Freedom' even if they hold City Privileged Regiment status. Her Majesty's forces have no general right of entry to the City unless the Lord Mayor has granted permission. A civic officer going by the title of the City Marshal escorts all military units of HM Forces through the city.

 The Buffs (Royal East Kent Regiment): 1672.
 City of London Imperial Volunteers: 12 January 1901.
  The Royal Marines: 1924.
  The Honourable Artillery Company: 1924.
 The Grenadier Guards: October 1915.
  The Royal Regiment of Fusiliers: 13 October 1924.
 , RN: 11 December 2005.
 600 (City of London) Squadron, RAuxAF: 18 June 2010.
 1475 (Dulwich) Squadron Air Training Corps: 2015.
 , RN: 15 November 2016.
 The Parachute Regiment
 3 Military Intelligence Battalion The Intelligence Corps: 1 April 2019.

Loughborough
 The Royal Anglian Regiment: 19 June 2007

Louth
 The College of Air Warfare Manby: 21 October 1965.

Ludgershall
 26 Engineer Regiment: 30 May 2015.

Lyme Regis
 The Dorset Regiment: 1945.
 The Devonshire and Dorset Regiment: 1958.
 The Rifles: 2007.

Macclesfield
 7th Battalion The Cheshire Regiment: 1949.
 1st Battalion The Mercian Regiment: 19 March 2009.

Malmesbury
 9 Regiment, Royal Logistic Corps: 29 June 2010.

Manchester
 The Manchester Regiment: 1946.
 613 (City of Manchester) Squadron, RAuxAF: 1957.
 The King's Regiment: 1962.
 The Grenadier Guards: 1964.
 , RN: 1998.
 The Duke of Lancaster's Regiment: 16 April 2010.
 207 (Manchester) Field Hospital (Volunteers): October 2011

 209 (The Manchester Artillery) Battery 103rd (Lancashire Artillery Volunteers) Regiment Royal Artillery: 30 October 2021.

March
 The Air Training Corps: 1996.
 The Army Cadet Force: 2001.

Maresfield
  5 (Maresfield) Squadron 11 (Royal School of Signals) Signal Regiment: 27 June 2021.

Market Drayton
 1st Battalion The Royal Irish Regiment: 21 April 2012.
 RAF Shawbury.

Marlborough
 4 Military Intelligence Battalion: 28 June 2011.

Maryport

 The Duke of Lancaster's Regiment: 20 May 2015.

Medway
 The Royal Corps of Engineers: 17 January 2008.
 , RN: 12 February 2011.
 "C" Company 3rd Battalion The Princess of Wales's Royal Regiment: 25 January 2018.
 The Royal Marines.
 The Royal Naval Association (Chatham Branch): 21 July 2022.
 The Chatham Historic Dockyard Trust: 21 July 2022.

Melksham
 2385 (Melksham) Squadron Air Training Corps: 12 May 2012.

Melton
 The Defence Animal Centre: 29 September 1977.
 , RN: 18 March 2007.

Merton, Devon
 The Coldstream Guards: 5 July 2011

Middlesbrough
 The Green Howards: 13 May 1944.
 The 34th (Northern) Signal Regiment (Volunteers): 29 April 1972.
 , RN: 15 March 2000.
 The Yorkshire Regiment: 25 October 2006.

Mid Sussex
 The Royal Yeomanry: 23 July 2014.

Milton Keynes
 678 (The Rifles) Squadron, Army Air Corps: 11 March 2018.

Mole Valley
 Defence Medical Rehabilitation Centre Headley Court: 25 May 2010.

Morley
 The West Yorkshire Regiment: 1945.

Mossley
 The Duke of Wellington's Regiment: 8 July 1967.

Newark-on-Trent
 RAF Cranwell: 2002.

Newbury
 42 Engineer Regiment (Geographic), RE: 1997.

Newcastle upon Tyne
 The Royal Northumberland Fusiliers: February 1948.
 The Royal Regiment of Fusiliers: 1968.
 The Northumberland Hussars: January 1969.
 The 15th/19th The King's Royal Hussars: May 1972.
 , RN: March 1978.
 101st (Northumbrian) Field Regiment Royal Artillery (Volunteers): January 1980.
 201 (Northern) General Hospital Royal Army Medical Corps (Volunteers): July 1984. 
 The Royal Naval Reserve (Tyne Division): October 1985. 
 The Royal Marines: July 1989.
 RAF Boulmer: 19 May 2018.

Newcastle-under-Lyme
 The Staffordshire Regiment: 1973.

New Forest
 The Royal Hampshire Regiment: 8 July 1986.
 17 Port and Maritime Regiment, RLC: 16 May 2016.

Newham
 "G" Company 7th Battalion The Rifles: 23 June 2012.

Northampton
 Northampton Unit Sea Cadet Corps: 26 March 2012.
 9th/12th Royal Lancers: 5 November 2012.

North East Lincolnshire
 45 Commando, RM: 16 May 2015.
 , RN: 16 September 2019.

North Tyneside
 Royal British Legion (Whitley Bay and Forest Hall Branches): 15 October 2009.
 2344 (Longbenton) Squadron Air Training Corps: 16 December 2014.
216 squadron (Tyne/Tees) Squadron Royal Corps of Transport (Volunteers) now 216 Tynemouth Squadron RLC. 23 February 1972.

Northumberland
 , RN: 2004.
 39th Regiment Royal Artillery: 3 September 2005.
 RAF Boulmer: 24 September 2010.
 101st (Northumbrian) Regiment, Royal Artillery: 30 April 2016.

North Warwickshire
 , RN: 1996.

Norwich
 1st East Anglian Regiment: 1964.
 1st Battalion The Royal Anglian Regiment: 1984.
 RAF Marham: 2008.
2nd Air Division, USAAF Association
Norfolk Constabulary

Nottingham
 The Sherwood Foresters: 1945.
 The Worcestershire and Sherwood Foresters Regiment: 1970.
 The Mercian Regiment: 15 October 2007.
 73rd Engineer Regiment (Volunteers)
 East Midlands Universities Air Squadron: June 2011
 E Battery Royal Horse Artillery: 20 January 2014
 , RNR: 14 May 2018.

Nuneaton and Bedworth
 Junior Leaders Regiment, Royal Artillery: 1972.
 30th Signal Regiment: 2002.
 250 Gurkha Signal Squadron: 2002.
 2nd Battalion The Royal Regiment of Fusiliers: 12 September 2010.

Oadby and Wigston
 The Royal Anglian Regiment: 2011.
 "B" Squadron Leicestershire and Derbyshire Yeomanry, Royal Yeomanry: 17 April 2012.

Oakham
 St George's Barracks, North Luffenham: 24 April 2013.
 RAF Cottesmore

Odiham
 RAF Odiham: June 2000.

Oldham
 41st (Oldham) Royal Tank Regiment (TA): 3 March 1954.
 75 Engineer Regiment (Volunteers): 13 June 1999

Oxford
 Oxfordshire and Buckinghamshire Light Infantry: 1 October 1945.  
 1st Green Jackets (43rd and 52nd): 7 November 1958. 
 Royal Green Jackets: 1 January 1966.
 The Rifles: 1 February 2007.

Oxfordshire
 4624 (County of Oxford) Movements Squadron, Royal Auxiliary Air Force: May 2013.

Pendle
 The Queen's Lancashire Regiment: 2001.
 The Duke of Lancaster's Regiment: 1 July 2006.

Peterborough
 RAF Wittering: 1983.
 158 (Royal Anglian) Transport Regiment, Royal Logistic Corps (Volunteers): 25 July 2009.
 115 (Peterborough) Squadron Air Training Corps: 28 April 2014.
 The Royal British Legion (Peterborough Branch): 28 July 2021.

Plymouth
 42 Commando, RM: 1955.
 The Merchant Navy: 22 March 2009.
 The Rifles: 25 September 2010.
 The Royal Naval Reserve 
 The Ministry of Defence Hospital Unit Derriford: 30 January 2023.

Poole
 The Rifles: 19 March 2010.

Portsmouth
 The Royal Hampshire Regiment: 20 May 1950.
  The Royal Marines: 1959
 Portsmouth Command of the Royal Navy: 1965
 : 2003
 : 2007

Preston
 The Loyal Regiment (North Lancashire): 7 August 1952. (This was subsequently transferred to:)
 The Queen's Lancashire Regiment: 9 September 1972.
 The Duke of Lancaster's Regiment: 1 July 2006.
 The 14th/20th King's Hussars: 6 November 1992.
 The Kings Royal Hussars

Purbeck
 Bovington Camp: 2010.

Ramsey
 Ramsey Division Army Cadet Force: 2 September 2018.

Ramsgate
 The Royal Hampshire Regiment: 1959.

Reading
 The Duke of Edinburgh's Royal Regiment: 1960.
 The Rifles: 8 May 2016.

Redbridge
 3rd Battalion (16th/44th Foot) Royal Anglian Regiment: 18 May 1965.
 45th (Essex) Signal Regiment (TA): 18 May 1965.
 36 (Eastern) Signal Regiment: 1967.

Redcar and Cleveland
 The Yorkshire Regiment: 2008.

Redditch
 The Mercian Regiment: 20 May 2009.
 37 Signal Regiment: 28 June 2014.

Ribble Valley
 The 14th/20th King's Hussars: 24 August 1992.  
 The King's Royal Hussars: 2 December 1992.
 The Duke of Lancaster's Regiment: 10 March 2011.

Richmond
 The Yorkshire Regiment
 The Royal Corps of Signals
 , RN
 The RAF Regiment: 1971.
 150 Provost Company Royal Military Police: 22 April 2006.
 1 Close Support Battalion Royal Electrical & Mechanical Engineers in 2012.
 The Royal British Legion in 2013.

Richmond upon Thames
 , RN: 2002
 The Royal Military School of Music: 2007
 The Poppy Factory: 12 December 2018.

Ripon
 The Royal Engineers: 27 July 1949.
 RAF Leeming: 14 September 2015.

Rochdale
 The Lancashire Fusiliers: 5 June 1947.  
 The Royal Regiment of Fusiliers: 24 August 1977.  
 , RN: 20 May 1992.

Romsey
 The Royal Hampshire Regiment: 26 September 1959.
 The Princess of Wales's Royal Regiment inherited the Freedom from the Royal Hampshire Regiment as a result of the 1992 Options for Change merger with the Queen's Regiment.

Rossendale
 Queen's Lancashire Regiment: June 2004.

Ross-on-Wye
 The Rifles: 13 July 2013.

Rotherham
 The Yorkshire Regiment:  3 August 2009.

Royal Wootton Bassett
 8 Training Battalion Royal Electrical and Mechanical Engineers: 6 July 2017.

Runnymede
 94 Signal Squadron Berkshire Yeomanry: 25 July 2009.

Rushcliffe
 RAF Newton: 1984

Rushmoor, Hampshire
 The Royal Hampshire Regiment: 20 May 1981.
 The Queen Alexandra's Royal Army Nursing Corps: 29 May 1981.
 The Royal Military Police: 22 March 1984. 
 The Royal Army Physical Training Corps: 17 September 2011.
 The Royal Gurkha Rifles: 30 July 2015

Salford
 The Lancashire Fusiliers: 18 October 1947.
 The Royal Regiment of Fusiliers: 26 April 1975.

Salisbury
 The Royal Wiltshire Yeomanry: 1944.
Royal Gloucestershire, Berkshire and Wiltshire Regiment: October 2004.
 The Rifles: 20 November 2010.
 32nd Regiment, Royal Artillery: 7 July 2016.
 The Royal Military Police: 13 June 2018.

Sandbach
 The Mercian Regiment: 29 June 2014

Sandhurst
 The Royal Military Academy Sandhurst: 1997.

Sandwell
 The Worcestershire and Sherwood Foresters Regiment – Oldbury 
 210 (Staffordshire) Battery, Royal Artillery (Volunteers) – West Bromwich 
 237 Transport Squadron, Royal Logistic Corps (Volunteers) – West Bromwich 
 Royal Monmouthshire Royal Engineers – Rowley Regis and Smethwick 
 3rd Battalion of The Mercian Regiment – Sandwell 
 116 Provost Company Royal Military Police TA (West Bromwich) – Sandwell: 9 January 2007.
 4 Regiment Royal Military Police: 9 January 2007.

Scarborough
 64 Medical Squadron 5 Medical Regiment: 2007.
 3 Medical Regiment: May 2015.
 The Yorkshire Regiment

Scunthorpe
 , RN: 1984.

Seaford
 210 (Sussex) Field Squadron, RE (TA): 1959.

Seaham
 The 4th Regiment Royal Artillery: 23 July 2022.

Sefton
 238 (Sefton) Squadron 156 Regiment Royal Corps of Transport: 6 March 1982 - transferred to:
 238 (Sefton) Squadron 156 (North-West) Transport Regiment Royal Logistic Corps (Volunteers): 13 April 2002
 RAF Woodvale: 3 July 2011
The Duke of Lancasters Regiment - 21 June 2017 
 , RN: 13 April 2023.

Sheffield
 The Duke of Wellington's Regiment: 13 April 2002.
 106 Field Squadron Royal Engineers: 2002.
 38 (City of Sheffield) Signal Regiment: 23 January 2010.

Shoreham
 , RN: 17 February 2011.

Shrewsbury
 , RN: 7 June 2002.  
 1st The Queen's Dragoon Guards: 10 December 2014.
 The Rifles: 9 September 2016.
 The Royal Yeomanry: 30 July 2022.

Skipton
 The Duke of Wellington's Regiment: 4 May 1991.

Snaith and Cowick
 51 Squadron, RAF: 22 April 2012.

Southampton
 The Royal Hampshire Regiment: 25 April 1946.
 17 Port and Maritime Regiment, RLC: 26 January 2000.
 , RN: 26 January 2000.

Southend-on-Sea
 1st Battalion The Royal Anglian Regiment: 17 June 2010.

South Derbyshire
 1211 (Swadlincote) Squadron Air Training Corps: 2 November 2017.

Southport
 22 (Southport) Transport Column The Royal Army Service Corps (TA): 18 April 1953.

South Ribble
 The King's Royal Hussars: 1992.

South Tyneside
 , RN: 1981.
 205 (3rd Durham Volunteer Artillery) Battery Royal Artillery: 2007.

 South Shields Volunteer Life Brigade: 11 May 2017.

Southwark
 256 (City of London) Field Hospital (Volunteers): 30 June 2013.
 The Royal Marines Reserve (City of London): 30 June 2013.
 "D" Company The London Regiment: 30 June 2013.
 2nd Battalion The Princess of Wales's Royal Regiment.

Spenborough
 The Duke of Wellington's Regiment: 24 February 1959.

Stafford
 RAF Stafford: 16 December 1954.
 22 Signal Regiment: 19 April 2008.
 Tactical Supply Wing RAF: 19 April 2008.
 The Royal British Legion (Stafford Branch): 25 November 2021.
 3rd Battalion The Mercian Regiment.
 , RN.
 Staffordshire Police.
 Staffordshire Fire and Rescue Service.

Stamford
 RAF Wittering: 1 July 1961.

St Albans
 , RN: 18 June 2004.
 201 (Hertfordshire and Bedfordshire Yeomanry) Parachute Battery RA (V): 8 July 2012.

St Edmundsbury, East Anglia
 RAF Honington: 1972.
 United States 3rd Air Force: June 2004.
 677 Squadron Army Air Corps (Volunteers): 12 December 2006.
 3 Regiment Army Air Corps (Wattisham): 22 June 2010.
 , RN: 18 May 2017.
 St Edmund Unit Sea Cadet Corps: 18 May 2017.

St Helens
 The Royal Military Police Association (Merseyside Branch): 29 February 2012.

St Ives, Cambridgeshire
 42 Engineer Regiment, RE: 3 July 2018.

St Neots
 The Royal Anglian Regiment: 5 July 2014.
 423d Air Base Group, USAF: 5 July 2014.
 2500 (St Neots) Squadron Royal Air Force Air Cadets: 19 October 2017.

Stockport
 The Cheshire Regiment: 1969.
 1st Battalion The Mercian Regiment: 11 November 2010.

Stockton-on-Tees
 1 Close Support Battalion Royal Electrical and Mechanical Engineers.
 The Rifles.
 The Yorkshire Regiment.

Stoke-on-Trent
 The Queen's Royal Lancers: 4 December 2013.

Stowmarket
 Wattisham Airfield: 26 March 2010.

Sunderland
 463 (mixed) Heavy Anti – Aircraft Regiment: 10 October 1951. 
 The Durham Light Infantry: 10 October 1951.
 582 Light Anti – Aircraft Searchlight Regiment: 10 October 1951.
 4th Regiment Royal Artillery: 19 December 1973.
 251 (Sunderland) Field Ambulance RAMC (V): 24 April 1985.
 , RN: 14 October 1989.
 HMS Ocean, RN: 26 July 2004.
 3rd Battalion The Rifles: 10 September 2010.

Surrey Heath
 Royal Military Academy Sandhurst: 20 January 2014.
 Joint Hospital Group South East: 12 September 2021.

Swindon
 The Wiltshire Regiment: 1960.
 RAF Lyneham: May 1964.
 The Royal Wiltshire Yeomanry: 2002.
 The Rifles: 9 April 2016.

Tameside
 The King's Regiment: 22 October 1994.
 The Duke of Lancaster's Regiment: 17 April 2007.
 The Mercian Regiment: 21 May 2013.

Tamworth
 Royal British Legion: 2014. 
 Royal Naval Association: 2014. 
 Mercian Regimental Association: 2014.  
 Royal Air Force Association: 2014.
 Tamworth and Wilnecote Unit St. John Ambulance: 25 September 2015.
 The Mercian Regiment.
 The Defence Medical Services.
 RFA Fort Rosalie, Royal Fleet Auxiliary.

Taunton Deane
 The Somerset and Cornwall Light Infantry: 30 September 1961. (Borough of Taunton)
 40 Commando, RM: 2003.
 The Light Infantry

Telford and Wrekin
  The Rifles: 29 May 2010.

Test Valley
 22 Engineer Regiment, RE: 28 April 1982.
 The Royal Hampshire Regiment: 25 June 1986.
 The Princess of Wales's Royal Regiment: 9 September 1992.
 The Army Air Corps: 25 September 1987.
 School of Army Aviation: 25 September 1987.

Tewkesbury
 Central Vehicle Depot Ashchurch RAOC: 5 June 1971.
 The Gloucestershire Regiment: 30 March 1974.
 RAF Innsworth: 28 April 1977.
 The Royal Gloucestershire, Berkshire and Wiltshire Regiment: 15 February 2000.
 Allied Rapid Reaction Corps: 17 September 2012.
 Allied Rapid Reaction Corps Support Battalion: 17 September 2012.

Thatcham
 The Royal School of Military Survey: 20 July 2011.

Thetford
 RAF Honington: 9 June 2019.

Thurrock
 215 (Essex) Squadron, RLC: 28 June 1986.
 The Royal Anglian Regiment: 18 July 1990.
 The Port of Tilbury Police: 25 September 2002.
 The Burma Star Association (Thurrock Branch): 26 November 2008.

Tiverton
 , RN.
 , RN.

Tonbridge and Malling
 The Princess of Wales's Royal Regiment.
 29 Squadron, RAF.

Torbay
 : 20 May 2015.
 RAF Brize Norton: 21 June 2018.

Torpoint
 , RN: 1997.

Tower Hamlets
 114 (1st London) Army Engineer Regiment (TA): 27 April 1961.

Trafford
 207 (Manchester) Field Hospital 2nd Medical Brigade RAMC (TA): 21 June 2011.

Trowbridge
 14th Regiment Royal Artillery: 28 June 2014.

Truro
 The Rifles: 1 June 2009.

Tunbridge Wells
 , RN: 20 November 1982.
 579 Field Squadron (EOD)(V): 18 October 2008.
 Princess of Wales's Royal Regiment: 15 July 2013.

Ulverston
 The Duke of Lancaster's Regiment: 7 May 2011.
 2223 (Ulverston) Squadron Air Training Corps: 18 April 2015.

Uppingham
 2nd Battalion The Royal Anglian Regiment: 3 May 2016.

Uttlesford
 33 Engineer Regiment, RE: 2009.
 101 Engineer Regiment, RE: 14 October 2011.

Uxbridge
 RAF Uxbridge: 18 March 1960.

Vale Royal
 The Cheshire Regiment: 1988.

Vale of White Horse
 3 Regiment RLC: 11 May 2016.
 4 Regiment RLC: 11 May 2016.
 The Rifles: 11 May 2016.

Wakefield
 The King's Own Yorkshire Light Infantry: 1945.
 The Yorkshire Regiment: 13 March 2010.
  The Rifles: 11 September 2010.

Wallingford
 RAF Benson: 1957.

Walsall
 The South Staffordshire Regiment: 1946.
 The Staffordshire Regiment: 1959.
 The Mercian Regiment: 2007.

Waltham Forest
 68 (ICCY) Signal Squadron: 1998.

Wandsworth
 The London Regiment: 1992.
 2nd Battalion Royal Tank Regiment: 2011.
 The Royal Marines Reserve: 30 January 2017.

Wanstead and Woodford
 45th (Essex) Signal Regiment (Volunteers): 1963.

Wantage
 Scots Guards: 2 August 2010.
 , RN: 14 October 2019.

Freedoms within Vale of White Horse and Oxfordshire apply to Wantage

Warminster
 3rd Battalion The Yorkshire Regiment: 21 September 2012.

Warrington
 South Lancashire Regiment: 17 September 1947.
 The Queen's Lancashire Regiment: 25 March 1970.
 The Duke of Lancaster's Regiment: 1 July 2006.
 75 Engineer Regiment: 20 May 2013.

Warwick
 MoD Kineton: 4 April 2013.
 The Royal Regiment of Fusiliers: 26 November 2013.

Warwickshire
 Royal Regiment of Fusiliers: 28 March 2014.

Watford
 1st East Anglian Regiment: 1959.
 Royal Anglian Regiment: 1964.

Waverley
 2nd Battalion The Princess of Wales's Royal Regiment: 15 June 2011.

Wellingborough
 The Royal Anglian Regiment: 27 April 1985.

Wellington
 The Rifles: 10 January 2022.

Wells
 The Somerset Light Infantry: 6 April 1956.
 , RN.
 The Rifles.

Wem
 RAF Shawbury: 1 August 2018.

West Bromwich
 904 Company 48th (South Midland) Division (TVAR): 1963.

West Lancashire
 The Duke of Lancaster's Regiment: 22 October 2011.

West Suffolk
 The Suffolk Regiment: 1944. (Borough of Bury St Edmunds)
 358 (Suffolk Yeomanry) Medium Regiment, RA: 1953. (Borough of Bury St Edmunds)
 The 1st East Anglian Regiment: 1963. (Borough of Bury St Edmunds)
  The Suffolk and Norfolk Yeomanry: 1967. (Borough of Bury St Edmunds)
 RAF Honington: 1972.
 3rd Air Force, USAF: 2000. (St Edmundsbury Borough)
 The Normandy Veterans' Association (Bury St Edmunds and District Branch No35): 2004. (St Edmundsbury Borough)
 1st Battalion The Royal Anglian Regiment: 2006. (St Edmundsbury Borough)
 3 Regiment Army Air Corps (Wattisham): 2010. (St Edmundsbury Borough)

City of Westminster
 , RN: 11 December 2005.

Weston-super-Mare
 40 Commando, RM: 21 June 2014.

Weymouth and Portland
 , RN: 2009.
 Weymouth Unit Sea Cadet Corps: 23 January 2017.

Whitehaven
 Whitehaven Unit Sea Cadet Corps: 27 June 2010.
 Whitehaven Detachment Army Cadet Force: 27 June 2010.
 1030 (Whitehaven) Squadron Air Training Corps: 27 June 2010.
 1st Battalion The Duke of Lancaster's Regiment: 20 May 2013.

Wigan
 "D" Squadron (TA Reserve) Royal Mercian and Lancastrian Yeomanry: 27 February 2008
 The Duke of Lancaster's Regiment: 2 December 2019.

Wimborne Minster
 The Rifles: 2010.

Wincanton
 1st Regiment Army Air Corps: 26 May 2016.

Winchester
 The Royal Army Pay Corps: 1970.
 The Adjutant General's Corps: 1996.
 Winchester Army Training Regiment: 17 April 2004.
 The Royal Hampshire Regiment: 15 September 1945.
 The Kings Royal Hussars: 1946.
 The Rifle Brigade (The Prince Consort's Own): 1946.
 The Royal Green Jackets: 1 January 1966.
 The Rifles: 1 February 2007.

Windsor and Maidenhead
 The Royal Berkshire Regiment: 1959
 The Duke of Edinburgh's Royal Regiment: 1960
 The Household Cavalry: 1965
 The Brigade of Guards: 1968
 The Berkshire Yeomanry: 1993
 The Royal Gloucestershire, Berkshire and Wiltshire Regiment: 1999
 The Rifles: 2006

Wirral
 The Cheshire Regiment: 1996.
 The Royal Marines: 1998.
 1st Battalion The Mercian Regiment: 2009.
 234 (Wirral) Transport Squadron, RLC (Volunteers): 18 February 2012.
 107 (Lancashire and Cheshire) Field Squadron (Volunteers): 18 February 2012.

 , RN: 6 July 2015.
 Wallasey Sea Cadet Corps: 6 July 2015.

Woking
 The Army Training Centre Pirbright: 8 December 2016.

Wokingham
 The Royal Electrical and Mechanical Engineers: 21 October 1978.

Wolverhampton
 Defence College of Aeronautical Engineering, DCAE Cosford
 The Staffordshire Regiment
 210 (Staffordshire) Battery 106th (Yeomanry) Regiment Royal Artillery
 West Midlands Fire Service
 , RNR: 29 September 2019.

Woodbridge
 23 Parachute Engineer Regiment: 2006.
 The Royal Air Force: 11 June 2016.
 The Royal British Legion (Woodbridge Branch): 11 June 2016.

Wood Green
 7th Battalion The Middlesex Regiment: 20 September 1945.

Woolwich
 The Royal Artillery: 28 March 1954.

Worcester
 The Worcestershire Regiment: 15 April 1950.
 The Worcestershire and Sherwood Foresters Regiment: 1970.
 The Mercian Regiment: 1 September 2007.
 The Queen's Royal Hussars: 2014.

Worthing
  H (Worthing Company) 2nd Volunteer Battalion Royal Sussex Regiment: 1901.
 The Princess of Wales's Royal Regiment: 4 July 1949.

Wychavon
 The Mercian Regiment: 29 March 2011.

Wycombe
 RAF High Wycombe: April 2011.

Wyre
 The Duke of Lancaster's Regiment: 12 April 2018.

Yeovil
RNAS Yeovilton: 1962

York
 The Royal Dragoon Guards: 24 April 1999.
 2 Signals Regiment: January 2001.
 "A" Squadron The Queen's Own Yeomanry: 3 December 2009.
 RAF Linton on Ouse: 19 September 2010.
 The Queen's Gurkha Signals: 8 September 2015.

Scotland

Aberdeen
 The Gordon Highlanders: 20 August 1949.
 , RN: 8 June 1992.
 4th Battalion, The Royal Regiment of Scotland: 1 July 2006.

Angus
 45 Commando, RM: 2003.
 The Black Watch Regiment: 2006.
 11 (AC) Squadron, RAF: 26 July 2019.

Ayr
 The Royal Scots Fusiliers: 15 June 1946.

Dumfries
 The King's Own Scottish Borderers: 1953.

Dumfries and Galloway
 The Royal Regiment of Scotland: 12 June 2008.
 The Royal British Legion (RBL Scotland): 1 April 2022.

Dundee
 The Black Watch (Royal Highland Regiment): 1954.

East Lothian
 1st Battalion The Royal Scots Borderers: 2012.
 "E" Squadron The Scottish and North Irish Yeomanry: 6 July 2019.

Edinburgh
 The Rifles: 5 November 2012.
 603 Squadron RAF: 3 July 2018.
 "E" Squadron The Scottish and North Irish Yeomanry: 2 April 2022.

Glasgow
 The Highland Light Infantry
 Royal Marines: 1 November 2014

Highlands
 The Royal Regiment of Scotland: 15 October 2015.

Inverness
 The Queen's Own Highlanders (Seaforth and Camerons): 1961.
 The 19th Regiment, Royal Artillery: 12 March 1999.

Kirkcaldy
 The Black Watch (Royal Highland Regiment) : March 1996.

Lossiemouth and Branderburgh
 RNAS Lossiemouth: 8 July 1967.

Orkney
 The Northern Diving Group Royal Navy: 9 July 2021.

Perth
 The Black Watch (Royal Highland Regiment): 19 July 1947.
 The Royal British Legion (Scotland): 8 May 2004.
 51st Highland Volunteers The Royal Regiment of Scotland: 8 May 2010.

Renfrewshire
 The Argyll and Sutherland Highlanders: 20 June 2011.

Scottish Borders
 The Royal Regiment of Scotland: 11 June 2011.

South Ayrshire
 "A" Squadron Queen's Own Yeomanry
 , RN: 17 July 2009.
 RAF Prestwick: 17 July 2009.

St Andrews
 RAF Leuchars: 1968.

Stirling
 The Argyll and Sutherland Highlanders: 1947.
 43 Squadron RAF: 2005.
 The Royal Regiment of Scotland: 10 March 2012.

Sutherland
 , RN: March 2011.

Wales

Aberconwy
 The Royal Welch Fusiliers: 2 September 1989.

Aberystwyth
 The Welsh Guards: 1955.

Anglesey
 RAF Valley: 1974.
 The Royal Welsh: 8 December 2011.
 The Royal Naval Submarine Service: 28 May 2019.

Arfon
 The Royal Welch Fusiliers 5 November 1975.

Bangor
  The Royal Welsh: 23 July 2011.

Barry
 RAF St Athan: 1959.

Blackwood
 1st Battalion The Royal Welsh: 25 September 2010.

Blaenau Gwent
 The Royal Welsh: 19 February 2011.
 The Royal British Legion: 4 November 2021.

Brecon
 The South Wales Borderers: 11 June 1948.
 Gurkha Demonstration Company The Brigade of Gurkhas: 21 November 1985.
 The Small Arms School Corps: 20 April 2017.

Bridgend
 The Royal Welsh: 30 August 2008.
 2 Company 1st Battalion The Welsh Guards: 11 May 2011.

Caernarfon
 The Royal Welch Fusiliers: 1946.
 The Royal Welsh: 25 April 2009.

Caerphilly
 The Royal Welsh: 26 September 2010.
 The Royal British Legion: 25 March 2022.

Cardiff
 The Welch Regiment: 10 June 1944.
 The Welsh Guards: 7 April 1957.
 The Royal Regiment of Wales: 11 June 1969.
 The Royal Welch Fusiliers: 7 November 1973.
 The 1st The Queen's Dragoon Guards: 29 July 1985.
 , RN: 3 February 1988.
 203 (Welsh) Field Hospital 2nd Medical Brigade: 21 April 2014.
 , RN: 18 May 2014.

Carmarthen
 The Welch Regiment: 1945. 
 The Royal Regiment of Wales: 1969.
 The Royal Welch Fusiliers: 8 July 1998.

Carmarthenshire
 2nd Battalion The Royal Welsh: 2008.

Ceredigion
 2nd Battalion The Royal Welsh: 25 April 2009.
 The Welsh Guards: 24 June 2020.

Chepstow
 1st Battalion The Rifles: 17 November 2011.

Clwyd
 The Royal Air Force.

Conwy
 The Royal Welch Fusiliers: 19 April 1958.
 1st Battalion The Royal Welsh: 20 September 2010.

Cowbridge with Llanblethian
 RAF St Athan.

Delyn
 The Royal Welch Fusiliers: 24 April 1976.

Denbighshire
 1st Battalion The Royal Welsh: 13 June 2011.

Flint
 384th Anti-tank Regiment Royal Artillery: 1947.

Flintshire
 The Royal Welsh: 24 April 2009.

Haverfordwest
 HMS Goldcrest: 1964.
 14 Signal Regiment: 4 March 2009.

Llandudno
 RAF Valley: September 1995.
 Llandudno Lifeboat Station, RNLI: January 2002.
 203 (Welsh) Field Hospital (Volunteers) RAMC: 19 September 2009.

Merthyr Tydfil
 The Royal Welch Fusiliers: 15 April 1994.

Monmouth
 The Royal Monmouthshire Royal Engineers: 1953.
 , RN: 18 January 2004.

Monmouthshire
 The Royal Welsh: 4 March 2011.

Neath Port Talbot
 The Royal Regiment of Wales: July 1993.
 The Royal Welsh: 2006.

Newport
 The 104th Regiment Royal Artillery (TA): 1978.
 The Royal Welch Fusiliers: 15 September 2001.
 , RN: 19 June 2006.
 The Royal British Legion: 28 October 2021.

Pembroke
 , RN: 15 September 2006.
 1st Battalion The Royal Welsh: 15 September 2018.

Pembroke Dock
 , RN: 15 September 2006.

Pencoed
 2426 (Pencoed) Squadron Air Training Corps: 4 December 2014.

Powys
 The Welsh Guards: 2011.

Prestatyn
 119 (Holywell) Recovery Company (V) Royal Electrical and Mechanical Engineers: 12 September 1992.

Rhondda Cynon Taf
 The Royal Welsh: 2010.
 The Welsh Guards: 15 May 2013. 
 MOD St Athan: 2 June 2018.

St Davids
 245 Signal Squadron 14 Signal Regiment: 12 May 1997.
 948 (Haverfordwest and St Davids) Squadron Air Training Corps: 2 May 2020.

Swansea
 The Welsh Guards: 15 September 1948.
 The Welch Regiment: 17 February 1960.
 The Royal Monmouthshire Royal Engineers: 15 April 1978.
 The Royal Regiment of Wales: 20 February 1981.
 , RN: 27 June 1981.
 Her Majesty's Coastguard (Swansea Station): 8 December 1982.
 The Mumbles Lifeboat Station, RNLI: 23 April 1987.
 The Royal Welch Fusiliers: 1 March 1994.
 , RN: 15 September 2006.
 The Royal Welsh: 13 September 2008.
 1st The Queen's Dragoon Guards: 2009.
 215 (City of Swansea) Squadron, Air Training Corps: 12 March 2016.
 , RNR: 17 March 2018.
 157 (Welsh) Regiment, RLC: 27 July 2019.

Tenby
 , RN

Torfaen
 Royal Welsh: 5 June 2010.
 The Royal British Legion: 28 June 2021.

Vale of Glamorgan
 RAF St Athan: 18 May 1974.
 The Merchant Navy Association: 16 April 2005.
 The Welsh Guards: 16 March 2006.
 The Royal Welsh: 21 February 2009.
 203 (Welsh) Field Hospital (Volunteers) RAMC: 17 April 2010. 
 , RN: 31 March 2012.

Wrexham
 Royal Welch Fusiliers: 5 June 1946.
 The Royal Welsh: 2008.
 101 Force Support Battalion, Royal Electrical and Mechanical Engineers: 5 April 2013.
 The Welsh Guards: 18 July 2014.

Wrexham Maelor
 The Royal Welch Fusiliers: 17 September 1983.

Northern Ireland

Antrim and Newtownabbey
 The Royal Ulster Constabulary: 1 June 1984. (Borough of Newtownabbey)
 The Royal Ulster Constabulary Reserve: 1 June 1984. (Borough of Newtownabbey)
 The Ulster Defence Regiment: 11 March 1989. (Borough of Newtownabbey)
 The Ulster Defence Regiment: 28 April 1990. (Borough of Antrim)
 The Royal Irish Rangers: 5 May 1990. (Borough of Newtownabbey)
 The Royal Air Force: 17 April 1993. (Borough of Newtownabbey)
 321 EOD Squadron, RLC: 30 October 1993. (Borough of Newtownabbey)
 The Royal British Legion: 11 May 1996. (Borough of Newtownabbey)
 The Royal Air Force: 15 March 1997. (Borough of Antrim)
 The Northern Ireland Fire and Rescue Service: 24 May 2000. (Borough of Newtownabbey)
 The Royal Ulster Constabulary: 3 March 2001. (Borough of Antrim)
 The Royal Ulster Constabulary Reserve: 3 March 2001. (Borough of Antrim)
 Northern Ireland Burma Star Association: 6 April 2002. (Borough of Newtownabbey)
 The Royal Navy: 18 May 2002.
 The Royal Naval Reserve: 18 May 2002.
 The Royal Marines: 18 May 2002.
 The Royal Marines Reserve: 18 May 2002.
 The Northern Ireland Ambulance Service: 10 December 2003. (Borough of Antrim)
 The Northern Ireland Fire and Rescue Service: 10 December 2003. (Borough of Antrim)
 The Royal British Legion: 24 June 2006. (Borough of Antrim)
 25 Engineer Regiment, RE: 26 May 2007. (Borough of Antrim)
 The Merchant Navy: 4 April 2012.

Ards and North Down
 The Irish Guards: 24 June 2022.

Ballymena
 The Royal Irish Regiment: 1 October 1994.

Ballymoney
 The Royal British Legion (Ballmoney Branch): 22 February 1997.
 The Royal Irish Regiment: 12 May 2012.
 152 (North Irish) Regiment, RLC: 1 September 2012.
 The Royal Ulster Constabulary
 The Royal Ulster Constabulary (Reserve)
 The Northern Ireland Fire Brigade

Bangor
 The Police Service of Northern Ireland: 25 March 2012.

Belfast
 The Royal Ulster Rifles: 6 February 1954. 
 The Royal Sussex Regiment: 1961.

Castlereagh
 The Ulster Defence Regiment: 1984.
 The Ulster Special Constabulary Association: 2 May 1992.
 The Regimental Association of the Ulster Defence Regiment: 1994. 
 The Royal Irish Regiment: 1995.
 The Royal British Legion: 1996.
 The 204 (North Irish) Field Hospital Royal Army Medical Corps (Volunteers): 1998.
 The Royal Ulster Constabulary GC: 2000.
 The Northern Ireland Prison Service: 2004.
 The 152 (North Irish) Regiment RLC (Volunteers): 25 May 2013.
 The 152 Royal Electrical and Mechanical Engineers Workshops: 25 May 2013.
 The Police Service of Northern Ireland: December 2014.

Causeway Coast and Glens
 152 (Ulster) Transport Regiment, RLC: 25 October 2008.
 206 (Ulster) Battery, Royal Artillery (Volunteers): 2015.
 The Royal Air Force: 8 April 2022.

Coleraine
 The Ulster Defence Regiment: 28 March 1981.
 206 (Ulster) Battery, Royal Artillery (Volunteers): 1992.

Larne
 The Royal Irish Regiment: 1 November 2008.

Lisburn
 The Royal Irish Regiment: May 2011

Mid and East Antrim
 "B" Squadron Scottish and North Irish Yeomanry: 31 January 2016.

Zimbabwe

Bulawayo
 3 March 1989: Bulawayo District Zimbabwe National Army.
 3 March 1989: 1 Brigade Zimbabwe National Army.

References

+
Freedom of the City recipients (military)
Freedom of the City recipients (military)